Michael John Nunes (born August 7, 1986, in Seattle) is an American actor who played Howie in Full House, Timmy in Parker Lewis Can't Lose, Li'l Bee in Thumbelina (1994) and Beany in The Pebble and the Penguin (1995), before Don Bluth and Gary Goldman went to 20th Century Fox to direct the film Anastasia (1997).

Filmography

External links

Living people
Male actors from Washington (state)
American male child actors
American male voice actors
1986 births
American people of Portuguese descent